Tulsidas (born Rambola Dubey; also known as Goswami Tulsidas; c.1511–1623) was a Ramanandi Vaishnava Hindu saint and poet, renowned for his devotion to the deity Rama. He wrote several popular works in Sanskrit and Awadhi, but is best known as the author of the Hanuman Chalisa and of the epic Ramcharitmanas, a retelling of the Sanskrit Ramayana based on Rama's life in the vernacular Awadhi.

Tulsidas spent most of his life in the city of Varanasi and Ayodhya. The Tulsi Ghat on the Ganges River in Varanasi is named after him. He founded the Sankatmochan Temple dedicated to Lord Hanuman in Varanasi, believed to stand at the place where he had the sight of the deity. Tulsidas started the Ramlila plays, a folk-theatre adaptation of the Ramayana.

He has been acclaimed as one of the greatest poets in Hindi, Indian, and world literature. The impact of Tulsidas and his works on the art, culture and society in India is widespread and is seen to date in vernacular language, Ramlila plays, Hindustani classical music, popular music, and television series.

Transliteration and etymology

The Sanskrit name of Tulsidas can be transliterated in two ways. Using the original Sanskrit, the name is written as Tulasīdāsa. Using the Hunterian transliteration system, it is written as Tulsidas or Tulsīdās reflecting the vernacular pronunciation (since the written Indian languages maintain the vestigial letters that are no longer pronounced). The lost vowels are an aspect of the Schwa deletion in Indo-Aryan languages and can vary between regions. The name is a compound of two Sanskrit words: Tulasī, which is an Indian variety of the basil plant considered auspicious by Vaishnavas (devotees of god Vishnu and his avatars like Rama), and Dāsa, which means slave or servant and by extension, devotee.

Sources

Tulsidas himself has given only a few facts and hints about events of his life in various works. Till late nineteenth century, the two widely known ancient sources on Tulsidas' life were the Bhaktamal composed by Nabhadas between 1583 and 1639, and a commentary on Bhaktamal titled Bhaktirasbodhini composed by Priyadas in 1712. Nabhadas was a contemporary of Tulsidas and wrote a six-line stanza on Tulsidas describing him as an incarnation of Valmiki. Priyadas' work was composed around a hundred years after the death of Tulsidas and had eleven additional stanzas, describing seven miracles or spiritual experiences from the life of Tulsidas. During the 1920s, two more ancient biographies of Tulsidas were published based on old manuscripts – the Mula Gosain Charit composed by Veni Madhav Das in 1630 and the Gosain Charit composed by Dasanidas (also known as Bhavanidas) around 1770. Veni Madhav Das was a disciple and contemporary of Tulsidas and his work gave a new date for Tulsidas' birth. The work by Bhavanidas presented more narratives in greater detail as compared to the work by Priyadas. In the 1950s a fifth ancient account was published based on an old manuscript, the Gautam Chandrika composed by Krishnadatta Misra of Varanasi in 1624. Krishnadatta Misra's father was a close companion of Tulsidas. The accounts published later are not considered authentic by some modern scholars, whereas some other scholars have been unwilling to dismiss them. Together, these five works form a set of traditional biographies on which modern biographies of Tulsidas are based.

Incarnation of Valmiki

He is believed by many to be a rebirth of Valmiki. In the Hindu scripture Bhavishyottar Purana, the god Shiva tells his wife Parvati how Valmiki, who got a boon from Hanuman to sing the glory of Rama in vernacular language, will incarnate in future in the Kali Yuga (the present and last Yuga or epoch within a cycle of four Yugas).

Nabhadas writes in his Bhaktamal (literally, the Garland of bhakt or devotee) that Tulsidas was the re-incarnation of Valmiki in the Kali Yuga. The Ramanandi sect believes that it was Valmiki himself who incarnated as Tulsidas in the Kali Yuga.

According to a traditional account, Hanuman went to Valmiki numerous times to hear him sing the Ramayana, but Valmiki turned down the request saying that Hanuman being a monkey was unworthy of hearing the epic. After the victory of Rama over Ravana, Hanuman went to the Himalayas to continue his worship of Rama. There he scripted a play version of the Ramayana called Mahanataka or Hanuman Nataka engraved on the Himalayan rocks using his nails. When Valmiki saw the play written by Hanuman, he anticipated that the beauty of the Mahanataka would eclipse his own Ramayana. Hanuman was saddened at Valmiki's state of mind and, being a true bhakta without any desire for glory, Hanuman cast all the rocks into the ocean, some parts of which are believed to be available today as Hanuman Nataka. After this, Valmiki was instructed by Hanuman to take birth as Tulsidas and compose the Ramayana in the vernacular.

Early life

Birth
Tulsidas was born on Saptami, the seventh day of Shukla Paksha, the bright half of the lunar Hindu calendar month Shraavana (July–August). This correlates with 1 August 1511 of the Gregorian calendar. Although as many as three places are mentioned as his birthplace, most scholars identify the place with Sookar Kshetra Soron, District Kasganj in Uttar Pradesh, a city on the banks of the river Ganga. In 2012 Sukarkhet Soron was declared officially by the government of Uttar Pradesh as the birthplace of Tulsi Das. His parents were Hulsi and Atmaram Dubey. Most sources identify him as a Sanadhya Brahmin of the Bharadwaj Gotra (lineage), although some sources claim he was a Kanyakubja or Saryupareen Brahmin.

There is difference of opinion among biographers regarding the year of birth of Tulsidas. Many sources rely on Veni Madhav Das' account in the Mula Gosain Charita, which gives the year of Tulsidas' birth as Vikrami Samvat 1554 (1497 CE). These sources include Shivlal Pathak, popular editions of Ramcharitmanas (Gita Press, Naval Kishore Press and Venkateshvar Press), Edwin Greaves, Hanuman Prasad Poddar, Ramanand Sarasvati, Ayodhyanath Sharma, Ramchandra Shukla, Narayandas, and Rambhadracharya. A second group of biographers led by Gosvami Tulsidas of Soron and Sir George Grierson give the year as Vikram 1568 (1511 CE). These biographers include Ramkrishna Gopal Bhandarkar, Ramghulam Dwivedi, James Lochtefeld, Swami Sivananda and others. The year 1497 appears in many current-day biographies in India and in popular culture. Biographers who disagree with this year argue that it makes the life span of Tulsidas equal 126 years, which in their opinion is unlikely if not impossible. In contrast, Ramchandra Shukla says that an age of 126 is not impossible for a Mahatma (great soul) like Tulsidas. The Government of India and provincial governments celebrated the 500th birth anniversary of Tulsidas in the year 2011 CE, according to the year of Tulsidas' birth in popular culture.

Childhood

Legend goes that Tulsidas was born after staying in the womb for twelve months, he had all thirty two teeth in his mouth at birth, his health and looks were like that of a five-year-old boy, and he did not cry at the time of his birth but uttered Rama instead. He was therefore named Rambola (literally, he who uttered Rama), as Tulsidas himself states in Vinaya Patrika. As per the Mula Gosain Charita, he was born under the Abhuktamūla constellation, which according to Jyotisha (Hindu astrology) causes immediate danger to the life of the father. Due to the inauspicious events at the time of his birth, he was abandoned by his parents on the fourth night, sent away with Chuniya (some sources call her Muniya), a female servant of Hulsi. In his works Kavitavali and Vinayapatrika, Tulsidas attests to his parents abandoning him after birth due to an inauspicious astrological configuration.

Chuniya took the child to her village of Haripur and looked after him for five and a half years after which she died. Rambola was left to fend for himself as an impoverished orphan, and wandered from door to door begging for alms. It is believed that the goddess Parvati assumed the form of a Brahmin woman and fed Rambola every day.

Initiation from guru and learning

At the age of six, Rambola was adopted by Narharidas, a Vaishnava ascetic of Ramananda's monastic order who is believed to be the fourth disciple of Ramananda, or alternately, the disciple of Anantacharya. Rambola was given the Virakta Diksha (Vairagi initiation) with the new name of Tulsidas. Tulsidas narrates the dialogue that took place during the first meeting with his guru in a passage in the Vinayapatrika. When he was seven years old, his Upanayana ("sacred thread ceremony") was performed by Narharidas on the fifth day of the bright half of the month of Magha (January–February) at Ayodhya, a pilgrimage-site related to Rama. Tulsidas started his learning at Ayodhya. After some time, Narharidas took him to a particular Varaha Kshetra Soron (a holy place with temple dedicated to Varaha – the boar avatar of Vishnu), where he first narrated the Ramayana to Tulsidas. Tulsidas mentions this in the Ramcharitmanas.

Most authors identify the Varaha Kshetra referred to by Tulsidas with the Sookarkshetra is the Soron Varaha Kshetra in modern-day Kasganj, Tulsidas further mentions in the Ramcharitmanas that his guru repeatedly narrated the Ramayana to him, which led him to understand it somewhat.

Tulsidas later came to the sacred city of Varanasi and studied Sanskrit grammar, four Vedas, six Vedangas, Jyotisha and the six schools of Hindu philosophy over a period of 15–16 years from guru Shesha Sanatana who was based at the Pancaganga Ghat in Varanasi. Shesha Sanatana was a friend of Narharidas and a renowned scholar on literature and philosophy.

Marriage and renunciation

There are two contrasting views regarding the marital status of Tulsidas. According to the Tulsi Prakash and some other works, Tulsidas was married to Ratnavali on the eleventh day of the bright half of the Kartik month (October–November) in Vikram 1589 (1532 CE). Ratnavali was the daughter of Dinbandhu Pathak, a Brahmin of the Vashishtha Gotra, who belonged to Badariya village of Kasganj district. They had a son named Tarak who died as a toddler. Once when Tulsidas had gone to a Hanuman temple, Ratnavali went to her father's home with her brother. When Tulsidas learned of this, he swam across the Yamuna river in the night to meet his wife. Ratnavali chided Tulsidas for this, and remarked that if Tulsidas was even half as devoted to God as he was to her body of flesh and blood, he would have been redeemed. Tulsidas left her instantly and left for the holy city of Prayag. Here, he renounced the Grihastha (householder's life) stage and became a Sadhu (Hindu ascetic).

Some authors consider the marriage episode of Tulsidas to be a later interpolation and maintain among that he was a bachelor. They include Rambhadracharya, who cite two verses in the Vinayapatrika and Hanuman Bahuka to mean that Tulsidas never married and was a Sadhu from childhood.

Later life

Travels 
After renunciation, Tulsidas spent most of his time at Varanasi, Prayag, Ayodhya, and Chitrakuta but visited many other nearby and far-off places. He travelled across India to many places, studying different people, meeting saints and Sadhus and meditating. The Mula Gosain Charita gives an account of his travels to the four pilgrimages of Hindus (Badrinath, Dwarka, Puri and Rameshwaram) and the Himalayas. He visited the Manasarovar lake in current-day Tibet, where tradition holds he had Darshan (sight) of Kakabhushundi, the crow who is one of the four narrators in the Ramcharitmanas.

Darshan of Hanuman 
Tulsidas hints at several places in his works, that he had met face to face with Hanuman and Rama. The detailed account of his meetings with Hanuman and Rama are given in the Bhaktirasbodhini of Priyadas. According to Priyadas' account, Tulsidas used to visit the woods outside Varanasi for his morning ablutions with a water pot. On his return to the city, he used to offer the remaining water to a certain tree. This quenched the thirst of a Preta (a type of ghost believed to be ever thirsty for water), who appeared to Tulsidas and offered him a boon. Tulsidas said he wished to see Rama with his eyes, to which the Preta responded that it was beyond him. However, the Preta said that he could guide Tulsidas to Hanuman, who could grant the boon Tulsidas asked for. The Preta told Tulsidas that Hanuman comes everyday disguised in the mean attire of a leper to listen to his Katha, he is the first to arrive and last to leave.

That evening Tulsidas noted that the first listener to arrive at his discourse was an old leper, who sat at the end of the gathering. After the Katha was over, Tulsidas quietly followed the leper to the woods. In the woods, at the spot where the Sankat Mochan Temple stands today, Tulsidas firmly fell at the leper's feet, shouting "I know who you are" and "You cannot escape me". At first the leper feigned ignorance but Tulsidas did not relent. Then the leper revealed his original form of Hanuman and blessed Tulsidas. When granted a boon, Tulsidas told Hanuman he wanted to see Rama face to face. Hanuman told him to go to Chitrakuta where he would see Rama with his own eyes.

At the beginning of the Ramcharitmanas, Tulsidas bows down to a particular Preta and asks for his grace (Ramcharitmanas, Doha 1.7). According to Rambhadracharya, this is the same Preta which led Tulsidas to Hanuman.

Darshan of Rama 
As per Priyadas' account, Tulsidas followed the instruction of Hanumana and started living in an Ashram at Ramghat in Chitrakoot Dham. One day Tulsidas went to perform the Parikrama (circumambulation) of the Kamadgiri mountain. He saw two princes, one dark and the other fair, dressed in green robes pass by mounted on horsebacks. Tulsidas was enraptured at the sight, however he could not recognise them and took his eyes off them. Later Hanuman asked Tulsidas if he saw Rama and his brother Lakshmana on horses. Tulsidas was disappointed and repentful. Hanuman assured Tulsidas that he would have the sight of Rama once again the next morning. Tulsidas recalls this incident in a song of the Gitavali and laments how "his eyes turned his own enemies" by staying fixed to the ground and how everything happened in a trice.

On the next morning, Wednesday, the new-moon day of Magha, Vikram 1607 (1551 CE) or 1621 (1565 CE) as per some sources, Rama again appeared to Tulsidas, this time as a child. Tulsidas was making sandalwood paste when a child came and asked for a sandalwood Tilaka (a religious mark on the forehead). This time Hanuman gave a hint to Tulsidas and he had a full view of Rama. Tulsidas was so charmed that he forgot about the sandalwood. Rama took the sandalwood paste and put a Tilaka himself on his forehead and Tulsidas' forehead before disappearing. This famous incidence is described in the verse चित्रकूट के घाट पर हुई संतन की भीर तुलसीदास चन्दन घिसे तिलक देते रघुबीर.

In a verse in the Vinayapatrika, Tulsidas alludes to a certain "miracle at Chitrakuta", and thanks Rama for what he did for him at Chitrakuta. Some biographers conclude that the deed of Rama at Chitrakuta referred to by Tulsidas is the Darshan of Rama.

Darshan of Yajnavalkya and Bharadvaja 
In Vikram 1628 (1572 CE), Tulsidas left Chitrakuta for Prayag where he stayed during the Magha Mela (the annual fair in January). Six days after the Mela ended, he had the Darshan of the sages Yajnavalkya and Bharadvaja under a banyan tree. In one of the four dialogues in the Ramcharitmanas, Yajnavalkya is the speaker and Bharadvaja the listener. Tulsidas describes the meeting between Yajnavalkya and Bharadvaja after a Magha Mela festival in the Ramcharitmanas, it is this meeting where Yajnavalkya narrates the Ramcharitmanas to Bharadvaja.

Attributed miracles 

Most stories about Tulsidas tend to be apocryphal, and have been carried forward by word of mouth. None of them were related by Tulsi himself, thus making it difficult to separate fact from lore and fiction. In Priyadas' biography, Tulsidas is attributed with the power of working miracles. In one such miracle, he is believed to have brought back a dead Brahmin to life. While the Brahmin was being taken for cremation, his widow bowed down to Tulsidas on the way who addressed her as Saubhagyavati (a woman whose husband is alive). The widow told Tulsidas her husband had just died, so his words could not be true. Tulsidas said that the word has passed his lips and so he would restore the dead man to life. He asked everybody present to close their eyes and uttered the name of lord Rama, on doing which the dead Brahmin was raised back to life. Also one who was with him for a certain period of their life got moksha (salvation) from this Maya (illusion world).

Tulsidas was acclaimed in his lifetime to be a reincarnation of Valmiki, the composer of the original Ramayana in Sanskrit. He is also considered to be the composer of the Hanuman Chalisa, a popular devotional hymn dedicated to Hanuman,the monkey god and divine devotee of lord Rama.

In another miracle described by Priyadas,   the Mughal Emperor Akbar summoned Tulsidas on hearing of his bringing back a dead man to life. Tulsidas declined to go as he was too engrossed in creating his verses but he was later forcibly brought before the Akbar and was asked to perform a miracle, which Tulsidas declined by saying "It's a lie, all I know is Rama." The emperor imprisoned Tulsidas at Fatehpur Sikri, "We will see this Rama." Tulsidas refused to bow to Akbar and created a verse in praise of Hanuman and chanted it (Hanuman Chalisa) for forty days and suddenly an army of monkeys descended upon the town and wreaked havoc in all corners of Fatehpur Sikri, entering each home and the emperor's harem, scratching people and throwing bricks from ramparts. An old Hafiz told the emperor that this was the miracle of the imprisoned Fakir. The emperor fell at Tulsidas' feet, released him and apologised. Tulsidas stopped the menace of monkeys and asked the emperor to abandon the place. The emperor agreed and moved back to Delhi. Ever since Akbar became a close friend of Tulsidas and he also ordered a firman that followers of lord Rama, lord Hanuman & other Hindus, should not be harassed in his kingdom.

Priyadas narrates a miracle of Tulsidas at Vrindavan, when he visited a temple of Krishna. When he began bowing down to the idol of Krishna, the Mahant of the temple named Parshuram decided to test Tulsidas. He told Tulsidas that he who bows down to any deity except their Ishta Devata (cherished form of divinity) is a fool, as Tulsidas' Ishta Devata was Rama. In response, Tulsidas recited the following extemporaneously composed couplet

When Tulsidas recited this couplet, the idol of Krishna holding the flute and stick in hands changed to the idol of Rama holding the bow and arrow in hands. Some authors have expressed doubts on the couplet being composed by Tulsidas.

Literary life

Tulsidas started composing poetry in Sanskrit in Varanasi on the Prahlada Ghat. Tradition holds that all the verses that he composed during the day, would get lost in the night. This happened daily for eight days. On the eighth night, Shiva – whose famous Kashi Vishwanath Temple is located in Varanasi – is believed to have ordered Tulsidas in a dream to compose poetry in the vernacular instead of Sanskrit. Tulsidas woke up and saw both Shiva and Parvati who blessed him. Shiva ordered Tulsidas to go to Ayodhya and compose poetry in Awadhi. Shiva also predicted that Tulsidas' poetry would fructify like the Sama Veda. In the Ramcharitmanas, Tulsidas hints at having the Darshan of Shiva and Parvati in both dream and awakened state.

Tulsidas is also credited with having composed a number of wise sayings and dohas containing lessons for life. A popular one among them is:

आवत ही हरसय नहीं, नैनन नहीं सनोह ।
तुलसी वहाँ न जाइये, चाहे कञ्चन बरसे मेर ॥ सिया पति राम चन्द्र जी की जय , जय जय बजरंगबली ।।
(Aawat hi harshe nahin, nainan nahin saneh. Tulsi tahan na jaiye, chahe kanchan barse megh. Lit. A place where people are not happy or welcoming when you come, where their eyes have no affection for you, Don't go there, even if a mountain of gold is showered.)

Composition of Ramcharitmanas

In the year Vikram 1631 (1575 CE), Tulsidas started composing the Ramcharitmanas in Ayodhya on Sunday, Ramnavami day (ninth day of the bright half of the Chaitra month, which is the birthday of Rama). Tulsidas himself attests this date in the Ramcharitmanas. He composed the epic over two years, seven months and twenty-six days, and completed the work in Vikram 1633 (1577 CE) on the Vivaha Panchami day (fifth day of the bright half of the Margashirsha month, which commenrates the wedding of Rama and his wife Sita).

Tulsidas came to Varanasi and recited the Ramcharitmanas to Shiva (Vishwanath) and Parvati (Annapurna) at the Kashi Vishwanath Temple. A popular legend goes that the Brahmins of Varanasi, who were critical of Tulsidas for having rendered the Sanskrit Ramayana in the Awadhi, decided to test the worth of the work. A manuscript of the Ramcharitmanas was kept at the bottom of pile of Sanskrit scriptures in the sanctum sanctorum of the Vishvanath temple in the night, and the doors of the sanctum sanctorum were locked. In the morning when the doors were opened, the Ramcharitmanas was found at the top of the pile. The words Satyam Shivam Sundaram (Sanskrit: सत्यं शिवं सुन्दरम्, literally "truth, auspiciousness, beauty") were inscribed on the manuscript with the signature of Shiva. The words were also heard by the people present.

Per traditional accounts, some Brahmins of Varanasi were still not satisfied, and sent two thieves to steal the manuscript. The thieves tried to break into the Ashram of Tulsidas, but were confronted by two guards with bows and arrows, of dark and fair complexion. The thieves had a change of heart and came to Tulsidas in the morning to ask who the two guards were. Believing that the two guards could be none other than Rama and Lakshmana, Tulsidas was aggrieved to discover that they were guarding his home at night. He sent the manuscript of Ramcharitmanas to his friend Todar Mal, the finance minister of Akbar, and donated all his money. The thieves were reformed and became devotees of Rama.

Last compositions
Around Vikram 1664 (1607 CE), Tulsidas was afflicted by acute pain all over his body, especially in his arms. He then composed the Hanuman Bahuk, where he describes his bodily pain and suffering in several stanzas. He was relieved of his pain after this composition. Later he was also afflicted by Bartod boils (Hindi: बरतोड़, furuncles caused by pulling out of the hair), which may have been the cause of his death.

The Vinaypatrika is considered as the last compositions of Tulsidas, believed to be written when Kali Yuga started troubling him. In this work of 279 stanzas, he beseeches Rama to give him Bhakti ("devotion"), and to accept his petition. Tulsidas attests in the last stanza of Vinaypatrika that Rama himself signed the manuscript of the work. The 45th stanza of the Vinaypatrika is sung as the evening Aarti by many Hindus.

Death
Tulsidas died at the age of 91 on 31 July 1623 (Shravan month of the year Vikram 1680) in Assi Ghat on the bank of the river Ganga. Like the year of his birth, traditional accounts and biographers do not agree on the exact date of his death.

Works

Twelve works are widely considered by biographers to be written by Tulsidas, six major works and six minor works. Based on the language of the works, they have been classified into two groups as follows–
 Awadhi works – Ramcharitmanas, Ramlala Nahachhu, Barvai Ramayan, Parvati Mangal, Janaki Mangal and Ramagya Prashna.
 Braja works – Krishna Gitavali, Gitavali, Sahitya Ratna, Dohavali, Vairagya Sandipani and Vinaya Patrika.
besides these twelve works, four more works are popularly believed to be composed by Tulsidas which include Hanuman Chalisa, Hanuman Ashtak, Hanuman Bahuk and Tulsi Satsai.

Ramcharitmanas

Ramacharitamanas (रामचरितमानस, 1574–1576), "The Mānasa lake brimming over with the exploits of Lord Rāma" is an Awadhi rendering of the Ramayana narrative. It is the longest and earliest work of Tulsidas, and draws from various sources including the Ramayana of Valmiki, the Adhyatma Ramayana, the Prasannaraghava and Hanuman Nataka. The work consists of around 12,800 lines divided into 1073 stanzas, which are groups of Chaupais separated by Dohas or Sorthas. It is divided into seven books (Kands) like the Ramayana of Valmiki, and is around one-third of the size of Valmiki's Ramayana. The work is composed in 18 metres which include ten Sanskrit metres (Anushtup, Shardulvikridit, Vasantatilaka, Vamshashta, Upajati, Pramanika, Malini, Sragdhara, Rathoddhata and Bhujangaprayata) and eight Prakrit metres (Soratha, Doha, Chaupai, Harigitika, Tribhangi, Chaupaiya, Trotaka and Tomara). It is popularly referred to as Tulsikrit Ramayana, literally The Ramayana composed by Tulsidas. The work has been acclaimed as "the living sum of Indian culture", "the tallest tree in the magic garden of medieval Indian poesy", "the greatest book of all devotional literature", "the Bible of Northern India", and "the best and most trustworthy guide to the popular living faith of its people."But, as he has said "हरि अनंत हरि कथा अनंता।( The story of the lord is endless as are his glories)

Several manuscripts of the Ramcharitmanas are claimed to have been written down by Tulsidas himself. Grierson wrote in the late nineteenth century, two copies of the epic were said to have existed in the poet's own handwriting. One manuscript was kept at Rajapur, of which only the Ayodhyakand is left now, which bears marks of water. A legend goes that the manuscript was stolen and thrown into Yamuna river when the thief was being pursued, and only the second book of the epic could be rescued. Grierson wrote that the other copy was at Malihabad in Lucknow district, of which only one leaf was missing. Another manuscript of the Ayodhyakanda claimed to be in the poet's own hand exists at Soron in Etah district, one of the places claimed to be Tulsidas' birthplace. One manuscript of Balakanda, dated Samvat 1661, nineteen years before the poet's death, claimed to be corrected by Tulsidas, is at Ayodhya. Some other ancient manuscripts are found in Varanasi, including one in possession of the Maharaja of Benares that was written in Vikram 1704 (1647), twenty-four years after the death of Tulsidas.

Other major works

The five major works of Tulsidas apart from Ramcharitmanas include:
 Dohavali (दोहावली, 1581), literally Collection of Dohas, is a work consisting of 573 miscellaneous Doha and Sortha verses mainly in Braja with some verses in Awadhi. The verses are aphorisms on topics related to tact, political wisdom, righteousness and the purpose of life. 85 Dohas from this work are also found in the Ramcharitmanas, 35 in Ramagya Prashna, two in Vairagya Sandipani and some in Rama Satsai, another work of 700 Dohas attributed to Tulsidas.
 sahitya ratna or ratna Ramayan (1608–1614), literally Collection of Kavittas, is a Braja rendering of the Ramayana, composed entirely in metres of the Kavitta family – Kavitta, Savaiya, Ghanakshari and Chhappaya. It consists of 325 verses including 183 verses in the Uttarkand. Like the Ramcharitmanas, it is divided into seven Kands or books and many episodes in this work are different from the Ramcharitmanas.
 Gitavali (गीतावली), literally Collection of Songs, is a Braja rendering of the Ramayana in songs. All the verses are set to Ragas of Hindustani classical music and are suitable for singing. It consists of 328 songs divided into seven Kands or books. Many episodes of the Ramayana are elaborated while many others are abridged.
 Krishna Gitavali or Krishnavali (कृष्णगीतावली, 1607), literally Collection of Songs to Krishna, is a collection of 61 songs in honour of Krishna in Braja. There are 32 songs devoted to the childhood sports (Balalila) and Rasa Lila of Krishna, 27 songs form the dialogue between Krishna and Uddhava, and two songs describe the episode of disrobing of Draupadi.
 Vinaya Patrika (विनयपत्रिका), literally Petition of Humility, is a Braja work consisting of 279 stanzas or hymns. The stanzas form a petition in the court of Rama asking for Bhakti. It is considered to be the second best work of Tulsidas after the Ramcharitmanas, and is regarded as important from the viewpoints of philosophy, erudition, and eulogistic and poetic style of Tulsidas. The first 43 hymns are addressed to various deities and Rama's courtiers and attendants, and remaining are addressed to Rama.

Minor works
Minor works of Tulsidas include:
 Barvai Ramayana (बरवै रामायण, 1612), literally The Ramayana in Barvai metre, is an abridged rendering of the Ramayana in Awadhi. The works consists of 69 verses composed in the Barvai metre, and is divided into seven Kands or books. The work is based on a psychological framework.
 Parvati Mangal (पार्वती मंगल), literally The marriage of Parvati, is an Awadhi work of 164 verses describing the penance of Parvati and the marriage of Parvati and Shiva. It consists of 148 verses in the Sohar metre and 16 verses in the Harigitika metre.
 Janaki Mangal (जानकी मंगल), literally The marriage of Sita, is an Awadhi work of 216 verses describing the episode of marriage of Sita and Rama from the Ramayana. The work includes 192 verses in the Hamsagati metre and 24 verses in the Harigitika metres. The narrative differs from the Ramcharitmanas at several places.
 Ramalala Nahachhu (रामलला नहछू), literally The Nahachhu ceremony of the child Rama, is an Awadhi work of 20 verses composed in the Sohar metre. The Nahachhu ceremony involves cutting the nails of the feet before the Hindu Samskaras (rituals) of Chudakarana, Upanayana, Vedarambha, Samavartana or Vivaha. In the work, events take place in the city of Ayodhya, so it is considered to describe the Nahachhu before Upanayana, Vedarambha and Samavartana.
 Ramajna Prashna (रामाज्ञा प्रश्न), literally Querying the Will of Rama, is an Awadhi work related to both Ramayana and Jyotisha (astrology). It consists of seven Kands or books, each of which is divided into seven Saptakas or Septets of seven Dohas each. Thus it contains 343 Dohas in all. The work narrates the Ramayana non-sequentially, and gives a method to look up the Shakuna (omen or portent) for astrological predictions.
 Vairagya Sandipini (वैराग्य संदीपनी, 1612), literally Kindling of Detachment, is a philosophical work of 60 verses in Braja which describe the state of Jnana (realisation) and Vairagya (dispassion), the nature and greatness of saints, and moral conduct. It consists of 46 Dohas, 2 Sorathas and 12 Chaupai metres.

Popularly attributed works
The following four works are popularly attributed to Tulsidas–
 Hanuman Chalisa (हनुमान चालीसा), literally, Forty Verses to Hanuman, is an Awadhi work of 40 Chaupais and two Dohas in obeisance to Hanuman. Popular belief holds the work to be authored by Tulsidas, and it contains his signature, though some authors do not think the work was written by him. It is one of the most read short religious texts in India, and is recited by millions of Hindus on Tuesdays and Saturdays. It is believed to have been uttered by Tulsidas in a state of Samadhi at the Kumbh Mela in Haridwar.
 Sankatmochan Hanumanashtak (संकटमोचन हनुमानाष्टक), literally Eight verses for Hanuman, the Remover of Afflictions, is an Awadhi work of eight verses in the Mattagajendra metre, devoted to Hanuman. It is believed to have been composed by Tulsidas on the occasion of the founding of the Sankatmochan Temple in Varanasi. The work is usually published along with Hanuman Chalisa.
 Hanuman Bahuka (हनुमान बाहुक), literally The Arm of Hanuman, is a Braja work of 44 verses believed to have been composed by Tulsidas when he suffered acute pain in his arms at an advanced age. Tulsidas describes the pain in his arms and also prays to Hanuman for freedom from the suffering. The work has two, one, five and 36 verses respectively in the Chhappaya, Jhulna, Savaiya and Ghanakshari metre.
 Tulsi Satsai (तुलसी सतसई), literally Seven Hundred Verses by Tulsidas, is a work in both Awadhi and Braja and contains 747 Dohas divided in seven Sargas or cantos. The verses are same as those in Dohavali and Ramagya Prashna but the order is different.

Doctrine
The philosophy and principles of Tulsidas are found across his works, and are especially outlined in the dialogue between Kakbhushundi and Garuda in the Uttar Kand of the Ramcharitmanas. Tulsidas' doctrine has been described as an assimilation and reconciliation of the diverse tenets and cultures of Hinduism. At the beginning of the Ramcharitmanas, Tulsidas says that his work is in accordance with various scriptures – the Puranas, Vedas, Upavedas, Tantra and Smriti. Ram Chandra Shukla in his critical work Hindi Sahitya Ka Itihaas elaborates on Tulsidas' Lokmangal as the doctrine for social upliftment which made this great poet immortal and comparable to any other world littérateur.

Nirguna and Saguna Brahman

As per Tulsidas, the Nirguna Brahman (quality-less impersonal absolute) and Saguna Brahman (personal God with qualities) are one and the same. Both, Saguna (qualified Brahman) and Aguna (or Nirguna - unqualified Brahman) are Akath (unspeakable), Agaadh (unfathomable), Anaadi (without beginning, in existence since eternity) and Anupa (without parallel) (अगुन सगुन दुइ ब्रह्म सरूपा। अकथ अगाध अनादि अनूपा॥). It is the devotion (Bhakti) of the devotee that forces the Nirguna Brahman which is quality-less, formless, invisible and unborn, to become Saguna Brahman with qualities. Tulsidas gives the example of water, snow and hail to explain this – the substance is the same in all three, but the same formless water solidifies to become hail or a mountain of snow – both of which have a form. Tulsidas also gives the simile of a lake – the Nirguna Brahman is like the lake with just water, while the Saguna Brahman is a lake resplendent with blooming lotuses. In the Uttar Kand of Ramcharitmanas, Tulsidas describes in detail a debate between Kakbhushundi and Lomasa about whether God is Nirguna (as argued by Lomasa adhering to monism) or Saguna (as argued by Kakbhushundi adhering to dualism). Kakbhushundi repeatedly refutes all the arguments of Lomasa, to the point when Lomasa becomes angry and curses Kakbhushundi to be a crow. Lomasa repents later when Kakbhushundi happily accepts the curse but refuses to give up the Bhakti of Rama, the Saguna Brahman. Though Tulsidas holds both aspects of God to be equal, he favours the qualified Saguna aspect and the devotees of the highest category in the Ramcharitmanas repeatedly ask for the qualified Saguna aspect of Rama to dwell in their mind. Some authors contend from a few couplets in Ramcharitmanas and Vinay Patrika that Tulsidas has vigorously contradicted the denial of Avatar by Kabir. In several of his works, Kabir had said that the actual Rama is not the son of Dasharatha. In the Balkand of Ramcharitmanas, Shiva tells Parvati – those who say that the Rama whom the Vedas sing of and whom the sages contemplate on is different from the Rama of Raghu's race are possessed by the devil of delusion and do not know the difference between truth and falsehood. However, such allusions are based on interpretations of the text and do not hold much water when considered in the context of Ramcharitmanas. Tulsidas, in none of his works, has ever mentioned Kabir.

The name of Rama

At the beginning of the Ramcharitmanas, there is a section devoted to the veneration of the name of Rama. As per Tulsidas, repeating the name of Rama is the only means to attain God in the Kali age where the means suited for other ages like meditation, Karma, and Puja are ineffective. He says in Kavitavali that his own redemption is because of the power, glory and majesty of the name of Rama. In a couplet in the Gitavali, Tulsidas says that wishing for liberation without refuge in the name of Rama is like wishing to climb to the sky by holding on to the falling rain. In his view, the name of Rama is greater than both Nirguna and Saguna aspects of God – it controls both of them and is illuminates both like a bilingual interpreter. In a verse in the Dohavali, Tulsidas says that the Nirguna Brahman resides in his heart, the Saguna Brahman resides in his eyes and the name of Rama resides on his tongue, as if a radiant gemstone is kept between the lower and upper halves of a golden casket. He holds that Rama is superior to all other names of God, and argues that ra and ma being are the only two consonants that are written above all other consonants in the conjunct form in Sanskrit because they are the two sounds in the word Rama.

Rama as Brahman
At several places in Tulsidas' works, Rama is seen to be the higher than Vishnu and not as an avatar of Vishnu, which is the general portrayal of Rama.

In the episode of the delusion of Sati in Ramcharitmanas, Sati sees many a Shiva, Brahma and Vishnu serving Rama and bowing at his feet. When Manu and Shatarupa perform penance, they crave to see that Supreme Lord "from a part of whose being emanate a number of Shivas, Brahmas and Vishnus." Brahma, Vishnu and Shiva come to them many times tempting them with a boon, but Manu and Shatarupa do not stop their penance. They are finally satisfied only by the appearance of Rama, on whose left side is Sita, from a part of whom are born "countless Lakshmis, Umas (Parvatis) and Brahmanis (Sarasvatis)." In the episode of marriage of Sita and Rama in Balkand, the trio of Brahma, Vishnu and Shiva is present – Brahma is astounded as he finds nowhere anything that is his own handiwork, while Vishnu is enchanted with Lakhmi on seeing Rama. In the Sundarkand, Hanuman tells Ravana that Brahma, Vishnu and Shiva can create, preserve and destroy by the might of Rama. In the Lankakand, Tulsidas presents the universe as the cosmic form of Rama, in which Shiva is the consciousness, Brahma is the reason and Vishnu is his intelligence. As per Tulsidas, Rama is not only an avatar, but also the source of avatars – Krishna is also an Avatar of Rama. Thus, Tulsidas clearly considers Rama as supreme brahman and not an avatar of Vishnu.

In the opinion of Urvashi Soorati, the Rama of Tulsidas is an amalgamation of Vishnu who takes avatars, Vishnu in the abode of Ksheera Sagara, Brahman and the Para manifestation of the Pancharatra. Macfie concludes that Tulsidas makes a "double claim", i.e. Rama is an incarnation of both Vishnu and Brahman. In the words of Lutgendorf, Tulsidas' Rama is at once "Valmiki's exemplary prince, the cosmic Vishnu of Puranas, and the transcendent brahman of the Advaitins."

Vedanta, World and Maya

In the Sundarkand of Ramcharitmanas, Tulsidas says that Rama is knowable by Vedanta.

As per Tulsidas, Rama is the efficient and material cause (Nimitta and Upadana) of the world, which is real since Rama is real. In several verses of the Ramcharitmanas, Tulsidas says that the animate and inanimate world is a manifestation of Rama, and the universe is the cosmic form of Rama. Authors interpret these verses to mean that the world is real according to Tulsidas, in keeping with the Vishishtadvaita philosophy of Ramanuja. However, at some places in the Ramcharitmanas and Kavitavali, Tulsidas compares the world to a night or a dream and says it is Mithya (false or unreal). Some commentators interpret these verses to mean that in Tulsidas' opinion the world is unreal as per the Vivartavada doctrine of Adi Shankara, while some others interpret them to mean that the world is transient yet real as per the Satkhyativada doctrine of Ramananda. Uday Bhanu Singh concludes that in Tulsidas' view, the world is essentially the form of Rama and appears to be different from Rama due to Maya. Its visible form is transient, which is what Tulsidas means by Mithya.

In the Vinayapatrika, Tulsidas says that the world in itself is neither true (Satya), nor false (Asatya), nor both true and false together (Satyasatya) – one who casts aside all these three illusions, knows oneself. This has been interpreted to mean that as per Tulsidas, the entire world is a Lila of Rama. At the beginning of the Ramcharitmanas, Tulsidas performs Samasti Vandana (obeisance to all beings) in which he bows down to the world also, saying it is "pervaded by" or "born out of" Sita and Rama. As per some verses in Ramcharitmanas and Vinaypatrika, when a Jiva (living being) knows the Self, Maya and Rama, it sees the world as being pervaded by Rama.

In the Balkand episode of the marriage of the princes of Ayodhya with the princesses of Mithila, Tulsidas presents a metaphor in which the four brides are compared with the four states of consciousness – the waking state (Jagrat), sleep with dreams (Swapna), dreamless sleep (Sushupti) and the fourth self-conscious state (Turiya). The four grooms are compared with the presiding divinity (Vibhu) of the four states – Vishva, Taijasa, Prajna and Brahman. Tulsidas says as the four states of consciousness with their presiding divinities reside in the mind of a Jiva, so the four brides with their grooms are resplendent in the same pavilion.

Tulsidas identifies Maya with Sita, the inseparable energy of Rama which takes avatar along with Rama. In his view, Maya is of two types – Vidya and Avidya. Vidya Maya is the cause of creation and the liberation of Jiva. Avidya Maya is the cause of illusion and bondage of the Jiva. The entire world is under the control of Maya. Maya is essentially the same but the two divisions are made for cognitive purposes, this view of Tulsidas is in accordance with Vaishnava teachers of Vedanta.

Views on other Hindu deities

As per Tulsidas, there is no incompatibility between devotion to Rama and attachment to Shiva. Tulsidas equates the Guru as an incarnation of Shiva, and a considerable part of the Balkand of Ramcharitmanas is devoted to the narrative of Shiva including the abandonment of Sati, the penance of Parvati, the burning of Kamadeva and the marriage of Parvati and Shiva. In addition, Tulsidas venerates the whole Hindu pantheon. The Ramcharitmanas begins with reverence of Ganesh, Sarasvati, Parvati, Shiva, the Guru, Valmiki and Hanuman. At the beginning of the Vinayapatrika, he bows to Ganesh, Surya, Shiva, Devi, Ganga, Yamuna, Varanasi and Chitrakoot, asking them for devotion towards Rama.

Bhakti
The practical end of all his writings is to inculcate bhakti addressed to Rama as the greatest means of salvation and emancipation from the chain of births and deaths, a salvation which is as free and open to men of the lowest caste as to Brahmins.

Critical reception

From his time, Tulsidas has been acclaimed by Indian and Western scholars alike for his poetry and his impact on the Hindu society. Tulsidas mentions in his work Kavitavali that he was considered a great sage in the world. Madhusūdana Sarasvatī, one of the most acclaimed philosophers of the Advaita Vedanta tradition based in Varanasi and the composer of Advaitasiddhi, was a contemporary of Tulsidas. On reading the Ramcharitmanas, he was astonished and composed the following Sanskrit verse in praise of the epic and the composer.
आनन्दकानने कश्चिज्जङ्गमस्तुल्सीतरुः ।
कविता मञ्जरी यस्य रामभ्रमरभूषिता ॥

ānandakānane kaścijjaṅgamastulsītaruḥ ।
kavitā mañjarī yasya rāmabhramarabhūṣitā ॥
Sur, a devotee of Krishna and a contemporary of Tulsidas, called Tulsidas as Sant Shiromani (the highest jewel among holy men) in an eight-line verse extolling Ramcharitmanas and Tulsidas. Abdur Rahim Khankhana, famous Muslim poet who was one of the Navaratnas (nine-gems) in the court of the Mughal emperor Akbar, was a personal friend of Tulsidas. Rahim composed the following couplet describing the Ramcharitmanas of Tulsidas –
रामचरितमानस बिमल संतनजीवन प्रान । 
हिन्दुवान को बेद सम जवनहिं प्रगट कुरान ॥ 

rāmacaritamānasa bimala santanajīvana prāna । 
hinduvāna ko beda sama javanahi̐ pragaṭa kurāna ॥ 
The historian Vincent Smith, the author of a biography of Tulsidas' contemporary Akbar, called Tulsidas the greatest man of his age in India and greater than even Akbar himself. The Indologist and linguist Sir George Grierson called Tulsidas "the greatest leader of the people after the Buddha" and "the greatest of Indian authors of modern times"; and the epic Ramcharitmanas "worthy of the greatest poet of any age." The work Ramcharitmanas has been called "the Bible of North India" by both nineteenth century Indologists including Ralph Griffith, who translated the four Vedas and Valmiki's Ramayana into English, and modern writers. Mahatma Gandhi held Tulsidas in high esteem and regarded the Ramcharitmanas as the "greatest book in all devotional literature". The Hindi poet Suryakant Tripathi 'Nirala' called Tulsidas "the most fragrant branch of flowers in the garden of the world's poetry, blossoming in the creeper of Hindi". Nirala considered Tulsidas to be a greater poet than Rabindranath Tagore, and in the same league as Kalidasa, Vyasa, Valmiki, Homer, Johann Wolfgang von Goethe and William Shakespeare. Hindi litterateur Hazari Prasad Dwivedi wrote that Tulsidas established a "sovereign rule on the kingdom of Dharma in northern India", which was comparable to the impact of Buddha. Edmour J. Babineau, author of the book Love and God and Social Duty in Ramacaritmanasa, says that if Tulsidas was born in Europe or the Americas, he would be considered a greater personality than William Shakespeare. In the words of the archaeologist F. R. Allchin, who translated Vinaypatrika and Kavitavali into English, "for people of a large part of North India Tulsidas claims reverence comparable to that accorded to Luther as translator of the Bible into the native German". Allchin also mentions that the work Ramcharitmanas has been compared to not only the Ramayana of Valmiki, but the Vedas themselves, the Bhagavad Gita, the Quran and the Bible. Ernest Wood in his work An Englishman Defends Mother India considered the Ramcharitmanas to be "superior to the best books of the Latin and Greek languages." Tulsidas is also referred to as Bhaktaśiromaṇi, meaning the highest jewel among devotees.

Specifically about his poetry, Tulsidas has been called the "emperor of the metaphor" and one who excels in similes by several critics. The Hindi poet Ayodhyasingh Upadhyay 'Hariaudh' said of Tulsidas –
कविता करके तुलसी न लसे 
कविता लसी पा तुलसी की कला । 

kavitā karake tulasī na lase 
kavitā lasī pā tulasī kī kalā । 
The Hindi poet Mahadevi Verma said commenting on Tulsidas that in the turbulent Middle Ages, India got light from Tulsidas. She further went on to say that the Indian society as it exists today is an edifice built by Tulsidas, and the Rama as we know today is the Rama of Tulsidas.

See also

 Hanuman Chalisa
 Ramcharitmanas
 Shri Ramachandra Kripalu
 Thumak Chalat Ram Chandra
 Bhakti movement

Notes

References

External links 

 
 The Ramcharitmanas of Tulasidas, published by Gita Press
 Tulsidas Biography

Indian male poets
Hindi-language poets
Hindu poets
Epic poets
Sant Mat
1497 births
1532 births
1623 deaths
Hindu revivalists
Translators of the Ramayana
Indian Hindu saints
Scholars from Varanasi
16th-century Hindu religious leaders
16th-century Indian poets
16th-century Indian scholars
Bhakti movement
Poets from Uttar Pradesh
Writers from Varanasi
Vaishnava saints
Longevity claims
Miracle workers